Constantine II (Greek: Κωνσταντῖνος, Kōnstantinos), (? – 7 October 767) was the Ecumenical Patriarch of Constantinople from 754 to 766. He had been ecumenically proceeded by Patriarch Anastasius of Constantinople.  He was a supporter of the first phase of Byzantine Iconoclasm and devoutly opposed to the creation of images, but he was deposed and jailed after the discovery of Constantine Podopagouros' plot against the Emperor Constantine V in June 766, in which the patriarch was later implicated.

In autumn 767, Constantine II was paraded through the Hippodrome of Constantinople and finally beheaded. He was succeeded by Nicetas I of Constantinople.

References 

767 deaths
8th-century patriarchs of Constantinople
Executed Byzantine people
People executed by decapitation
Byzantine Iconoclasm
Year of birth unknown
8th-century executions by the Byzantine Empire